Carel Willem Hendrik Eiting (born 11 February 1998) is a Dutch professional footballer who plays as a midfielder for Eredivisie club Volendam.

Club career

Ajax
Eiting is a youth exponent from Ajax. He made his professional debut with Jong Ajax on 12 August 2016 in an Eerste Divisie game against Almere City playing the full match. On 19 September 2020, Eiting joined EFL Championship side Huddersfield Town on loan for the 2020–21 season.

He made his Huddersfield debut in an EFL Championship fixture against Nottingham Forest on 25 September 2020, coming on as a half-time substitute for Jonathan Hogg. He scored his first goal for the club in a 1-1 draw with Luton Town on 7 November 2020.

Genk
On 25 June 2021, it was announced that K.R.C. Genk had signed Eiting to a 4-year contract transferring from Ajax for an undisclosed amount, joining the team of John van den Brom. His contract with the club was cancelled on 30 January 2022.

Huddersfield Town
On 31 January 2022, Eiting returned to Huddersfield Town on a deal to the end of the 2021–22 season, following the cancellation of his contract at Genk. Huddersfield announced on 1 June 2022 that he had been released.

Volendam
On 4 August 2022, Eiting signed a two-year contract with Volendam.

Career statistics

Honours
Ajax
 Eredivisie: 2018–19
 KNVB Cup: 2018–19

References

1998 births
Living people
Footballers from Amsterdam
Dutch footballers
Netherlands youth international footballers
Netherlands under-21 international footballers
Association football midfielders
AFC Ajax players
Jong Ajax players
Huddersfield Town A.F.C. players
K.R.C. Genk players
FC Volendam players
Eredivisie players
Eerste Divisie players
English Football League players
Belgian Pro League players
Dutch expatriate footballers
Expatriate footballers in England
Expatriate footballers in Belgium
Dutch expatriate sportspeople in England
Dutch expatriate sportspeople in Belgium